Qazyan (also, Kaz’yan and Kaziyan) is a village and municipality in the Ujar Rayon of Azerbaijan.  It has a population of 6,018.

Notable natives 

National Hero of Azerbaijan.
 Xalil Babayev — Police major USSR

References 

Populated places in Ujar District